Cheikh Anta Diop University, also known as the Cheikh Anta Diop University of Dakar, is a university in Dakar, Senegal. It is named after the Senegalese physicist, historian and anthropologist Cheikh Anta Diop and has an enrollment of over 60,000.

History
Cheikh Anta Diop University predates Senegalese independence and grew out of several French institutions set up by the colonial administration.  In 1918, the French created the "école africaine de médecine" (African medical school), mostly to serve white and Métis students but also open to the small educated elite of the four free towns of Senegal with nominal French citizenship.  In 1936, under the Popular Front government in France, Dakar became home to the Institut Fondamental d'Afrique Noire (IFAN), an institute for the study of African culture.

In 1950s, with decolonisation already looming, the French administration expanded these schools, added science faculties, and combined the schools into the "Institut des Hautes Etudes de Dakar".  In 1957, a new campus was constructed as the 18th French Public University, attached to the University of Paris and the University of Bordeaux.  This became the University of Dakar the largest and most prestigious university in French West Africa. In 1987, its name was changed to honor the Senegalese philosopher and anthropologist, Cheikh Anta Diop.

Enrollment growth
At independence in 1960, enrollment was 1,018 students, only 39% Senegalese, with most of the rest from other former French colonies. By 1976, this number grew to 8,014.

In the 1970s, a time of state financial crisis, funding to higher education was cut, and international agencies stepped in over the next decade. Most of this funding, though, went to meet the needs of primary schools.  In the 1990s and 2000s there was a huge boom in Senegalese primary and secondary education, much of it funded through international projects. In 1984 around 50% of Senegalese children received primary education and by 2004 more than 90% did.

In the mid-1980s around 20% of World Bank funding to Senegalese education went to higher education, but this figure dropped to 7% by the mid-1990s.  With these projects came severe World Bank restrictions, dramatically cutting domestic funding available to university programs. As students who have benefited from primary and secondary education age, Cheikh Anta Diop University has had its already stretched resources stretched further.  Nine thousand Senegalese students received a Baccalaureate degree in 2000, while total registration shot above 40,000, for a campus built with only 5,000 dorm rooms.

Despite these pressures Cheikh Anta Diop University maintains a reputation as one of Africa's most prestigious institutions.  Most of the post-independence generation of Senegalese leaders are graduates of the university, and its alumni teach in universities around the world.

Academics
The education system follows the French pattern, with oral and/or written final exams administered at the end of the year. All courses at the university are taught in French, except those in language departments other than French.

Schools and institutes

UCAD offers courses of study in Humanities, Sciences, Engineering, Medicine, Finance, Accounting, and Law. The university awards the following degrees: B.A., B.S., Ph.D., and D.M.A.

The School of Medicine includes departments of Pharmacy, Research, and Surgery. The university also encompasses the Institute of Sciences of the Environment (ISE) and the Institute of Sciences of Earth (ISE).

The Institut Fondamental d'Afrique Noire (IFAN), founded in 1936, remains one of the world centers of African Studies. The IFAN Museum of African Arts' Musée d'Art africain, attached to IFAN, displays and conserves a world-renowned collection of African arts.

The Centre de linguistique appliquée de Dakar (Center of Applied Linguistics of Dakar) at CADU is the regulatory body for the Wolof language.

Language studies are divided into the following disciplines: Philosophy, Sociology, History, Geography, Letters, Arabic, Russian, Languages and Civilizations, English, Spanish, Portuguese, Italian, Latin, German and Linguistics.

The university oversees a language school: Institut de Français pour Etrangers (IFE). The IFE specializes in French language studies aimed at foreign students in preparation for regular courses taught in French.

Foreign programs
UCAD hosts a number of foreign study abroad programs, including ones administered by Wells College, Indiana University, and the University of Oregon in the United States and numerous European universities. Participants in the program typically take a required course in Introductory Wolof and a French language (if applicable) course through the IFE in addition to regular university courses taught in French.

A division of the university offers courses for foreign students in Senegalese and African studies, including African literature, history, politics, philosophy, and sociology.

CADU is a member of the Federation of the Universities of the Islamic World.

Special requirements
For foreign students, UCAD requires a minimum age of 18 to enroll in studies in Pharmacy and a minimum age of 22 to enroll in studies relating to oral surgery.

Student life
UCAD has a diverse student body drawn from many countries including Senegal, Chad, Burkina-Faso, Ivory Coast, France, Togo, Benin, Nigeria, the United States, Mauritania, Mali, Morocco, Rwanda, Cameroon, Belgium, and the United Kingdom.

As with a number of other African universities, UCAD occasionally experiences student strikes protesting government or university policies, most notable of which occurred during the 1993 presidential election.

With over 60,000 students and only 5,000 dormitory rooms, most students from outside Dakar must look for other accommodations.  Many students live in the Cité Aline Sitoe Diatta, near the university campus, and those who can't afford Dakar's often high rents often share rooms.

Violence

The university has had a number of notable incidents of violence. A Senegalese LGBT organization noted in 2016 that ten cases of homophobic mob violence had occurred at the university since 2012. One of these, following a riot at the university, resulted in the death of the student who was suspected to be gay. The riot followed an attempt to apprehend the student, who had sought refuge in the university's bank and security office. Separately, self-immolations and clashes between students and police have been reported after students unsuccessfully demanded scholarships or challenged grading schemes.

Notable alumni and professors

Notable instructors
Abdoulaye Bathily, former government minister and President candidate, Professor of History.
Souleymane Bachir Diagne, Senegalese philosopher, former Vice-dean of the College of Humanities and Professor of Philosophy.
Souleymane Mboup, microbiologist, leader of team that discovered HIV-2, and leads the Bacteriology-Virology Laboratory at le Dantec Hospital.
Amsatou Sow Sidibé, Senegalese lawyer and presidential candidate
Khady Sylla, Senegalese novelist
Louis-Vincent Thomas, French sociologist, anthropologist, ethnologist, former professor.
Abdoulaye Wade, Former President of Senegal, former dean of the law and economics faculty.

Notable students
Birane Hane, Senegalese entrepreneur, investor, and community leader.
Simeon Aké, former Ivorian Foreign Minister and UN Ambassador.
Barthélémy Attisso, guitarist and lawyer.
Sangaré Niamoto Ba, Minister of Mali
Sékou Ba, former Burkina Faso Minister of Animal Resources
Sokhna Benga, Senegalese novelist and poet
Emmanuel Bombande, cofounder and executive director of the West Africa Network for Peacebuilding, Chair of the Board of the Global Partnership for the Prevention of Armed Conflict
Yayi Boni, President of Benin.
Ousmane Camara, former Senegalese Chief Justice.
Awa Marie Coll-Seck, former Senegalese Minister of Health.
Mbaye Diagne, Senegalese Army officer and a United Nations military observer credited with saving many lives during the 1994 Rwandan genocide.
Souleymane Bachir Diagne (Philosophy), professor at Columbia University.
Salif Diallo, Master of Law, Burkinabé political leader.
Cheick Sidi Diarra, United Nations Special Adviser on Africa and High Representative for the Least Developed Countries, Landlocked Developing Countries and Small Island Developing States (OSAA/OHRLLS).
Ousmane Tanor Dieng:, International Relations, Law; first Secretary of the Socialist Party of Senegal, vice-president of the Socialist International.
Abdou Diouf, 2nd President of Senegal
Mamadou Diouf, historian of Cayor, former CADU professor, and director of African Studies at Columbia University.
Adebayo Faleti, Nigerian Poet, Writer and Actor.
Ibrahima Fall (politician): former Foreign Minister and professor of Law
Teguest Guerma, Medical Post-Doctorate, Associate Director of the HIV/AIDS Department, of the World Health Organisation.
Ibrahim Boubacar Keïta, president of Mali
Souleymane Mboup, microbiologist and leader of team that discovered HIV-2
Molly Melching, Human rights activist.
Kanidoua Naboho, Doctor of Medicine, Burkinabé political leader.
Doudou Ndoye, Senegalese politician (Law)
Erin Pizzey, activist and founder of world's first domestic violence shelter.
Jean Pliya, Beninois playwright and short story writer.
Ibrahima-Abou Sal, Mauritanian Historian.
Théodore-Adrien Sarr, Archbishop of Dakar, licentiate in Greek & Latin.
Talla Sylla, Senegalese politician, leader of APJ
Soham El Wardini, mayor of Dakar (first female to be mayor post-independence)
Marie Khemesse Ngom Ndiaye, doctor and health minister

Honorary degrees
Nelson Mandela: Honorary Doctorate conferred, 30 June 1992

See also
Gaston Berger University, Saint Louis, Senegal
Universities in Africa
Education in Senegal
WARC

References

IFLA French Language Centre Established in the University Library, Dakar, Senegal, International Federation of Library Associations and Institutions (IFLA). 20 August 2007.
Senegalese pay homage to Cheikh Anta Diop Tuesday, Dakar, Senegal, 02/07.
Cheikh Anta Diop University Library, Bibliothèque Centrale de l'Université Cheikh Anta Diop de Dakar (UCAD), ArchNet.org.
Pina, Jean Rousset de, La Nouvelle Bibliothèque centrale de l'Université de Dakar, BBF, 1966, n° 08, p. 293-304  Consulted 18 March 2008
Celebrations at the Cheikh Anta Diop University, (FIFA.com) Tuesday 20 November 2007.
Fiftieth Anniversary : Cheikh Anta Diop University (Sénégal), 2007, Canadian International Development Research Centre.
Senegal ICT Resource Centre: Creating R&D Capacity, 2004, Canadian International Development Research Centre.
Kone, Pierrette Women in the university hierarchy at the Cheikh Anta Diop University Women in higher education in Africa; Publ: 1995; p. 140-148.
Niang, Souleymane African universities and globalisation Les Universités africaines et la mondialisation Higher education in Africa: achievements, challenges and prospects; Publ: 1998; p. 31-40.
Africa’s Storied Colleges, Jammed and Crumbling, By LYDIA POLGREEN, The New York Times, 20 May 2007.
NOTES FROM ACADEME Senegalese Scholar Focuses on Race in American Society, By Carolyn J. Mooney, The Chronicle of Higher Education, 3 July 1997.
Francophone Africa Universities’ Contribution to Development, Lessons to be Learned from Successful Initiatives, The World Bank, Seminar, Saly, Senegal, November 30-December 2, 2005 .
 Clark, Andrew Francis; Phillips, Lucie Colvin; Phillips, Lucie Colvin. Historical Dictionary of Senegal. Scarecrow Press: (2nd Ed, 1995)

External links

Official Web links
 
 UCAD history page
 UCAD-EBAD Campus Guide, Library school at EBAD.
 Université Cheikh Anta Diop de Dakar et la Faculté des Lettres et Sciences Humaines.
 École Inter-États des Sciences et Médecine Vétérinaire de Dakar (site officiel)

 
Universities in Senegal
Educational institutions established in 1957
Forestry education
Education in Dakar
1957 establishments in French West Africa